Torres del Paine is a Chilean commune located in the inland of Última Esperanza Province and Magallanes Region. The commune is administered by the municipality in Cerro Castillo, the major settlement in the commune. Torres del Paine National Park lies within the commune.  Paine means "blue" in the native Tehuelche (Aonikenk) language and is pronounced PIE-nay.

Demographics
The population grew by 53.3% (257 persons) between the 1992 and 2002 censuses.

Administration
As a commune, Torres del Paine is a third-level administrative division of Chile administered by a municipal council, headed by an alcalde who is directly elected every four years. The 2012-2016 alcalde is Anahi Cardenas Rodríguez (Ind.).

Within the electoral divisions of Chile, Torres del Paine is represented in the Chamber of Deputies by Juan Morano (PDC) and Gabriel Boric (Ind.) as part of the 60th electoral district, which includes the entire Magallanes y la Antártica Chilena Region. The commune is represented in the Senate by Carlos Bianchi Chelech (Ind.) and Carolina Goic (PDC) as part of the 19th senatorial constituency (Magallanes y la Antártica Chilena Region).

Gallery

References

External links
  Municipality of Torres del Paine

Communes of Chile
Populated places in Última Esperanza Province
Populated places in Magallanes Region